The Battle of Tragh-Bhaile was fought in Ireland in 1399 between the forces of Henry O'Neill's sons and the Anglo-Irish. The Anglo-Irish were victorious.

The O'Neill forces, led by Donal MacHenry of Tyrone, attacked the English at Tragh-Bhaile (Dundalk, County Louth), but were repulsed. Donal was captured and sent to England.

See also
 Irish battles

References

Tragh-Bhaile
Tragh-Bhaile
1399 in Ireland
Tragh-Bhaile